Battle of Acre may refer to:

 The Siege of Acre (1189–1191)
 The Battle of Acre (1258) between the Genoese and Venetians
 The Siege of Acre (1291) by the Mamluks
 The Siege of Acre (1799) by Napoleon
 The Battle of Acre (1840)

See also
 Siege of Acre (disambiguation)